The Napier Dagger was a 24-cylinder H-pattern (or H-Block) air-cooled engine designed by Frank Halford and built by Napier before World War II.  It was a development of the earlier Napier Rapier.

Design and development
The H-Block has a compact layout, as it essentially consists of two vertically opposed, flat-twelve inline engines lying side-by-side and driving side-by-side crankshafts. Another advantage is that since the cylinders are opposed, the motion in one is balanced by the opposite motion in the one on the opposite side, leading to very smooth running. The Dagger was remarkable for its fast rotation, running at up to 4,000 rpm but unlike the later Napier Sabre, it had conventional poppet valves.

Although considered a masterpiece of engine design by Frank Halford, there were problems with cooling, maintenance, manufacturing and weight, which were not solved during the Dagger's lifetime and went unresolved well into the lifetime of the Napier Sabre, its successor. The Dagger powered the Hawker Hector army co-operation aircraft and the Handley Page Hereford, a variant of the Hampden bomber. The operational usefulness of the Hector was restricted by engine cooling problems, which made it unsuitable for operations in the tropics and the Hereford was found to be unsuitable for combat, because its Dagger VIII engines were noisy and unreliable. The Dagger was also used in the experimental Martin-Baker MB 2 fighter.

Variants
Napier-Halford Dagger I
1934 – 650 hp.
Dagger II
1938 – 755 hp
Dagger IIIM
1938 – 725 hp
Dagger VIII
1938 – 1000 hp, intermediate altitude supercharger, initially known as E.108

Applications

Note:
Fairey Battle testbed only
Handley Page Hereford
Hawker Hart
Hawker Hector
Martin-Baker MB 2

Engines on display
A preserved Napier Dagger is on display at the Royal Air Force Museum London.

Specifications (Napier Dagger III MS)

See also

References 

Jane's All the World's Aircraft 1942

Notes

Bibliography

Gunston, Bill. World Encyclopedia of Aero Engines: From the Pioneers to the Present Day. 5th edition, Stroud, UK: Sutton, 2006. 
 Lumsden, Alec. British Piston Engines and Their Aircraft. Marlborough, UK: Airlife Publishing, 2003. .
White, Graham. Allied Aircraft Piston Engines of World War II: History and Development of Frontline Aircraft Piston Engines Produced by Great Britain and the United States During World War II. Warrendale, Pennsylvania: SAE International, 1995.

External links

Napier Power Heritage Trust site
 Napier Dagger at oldengine.org

Dagger
1930s aircraft piston engines
H engines